Canana Films is a Mexican film and television production company and former distributor. Founded in 2005, Canana is focused on Latin American-focused projects in Spanish and English and became one of Mexico's leading producer-distributors during the late 2000s/early 2010s. Canana has been inactive since 2020.

Among their best known productions are Cary Joji Fukunaga's Sin nombre (2009), the action thriller Miss Bala (2011) and its 2019 American adaptation, the Oscar-nominated drama No (2012), the comedy Rudo y Cursi (2006), and the biopic Cesar Chavez (2014).

Profile
Canana was founded in 2005 by Mexican actors Gael García Bernal and Diego Luna and producer Pablo Cruz. García Bernal and Luna departed the company in 2018, with Cruz and Arturo Sampson providing leadership. García Bernal and Luna subsequently founded their studio La Corriente del Golfo.Cruz went on to co-found the international production studio El Estudio in 2020.

In 2005, they partnered with Focus Features for worldwide film rights. Beginning in 2007, Canana began distributing films in Mexico focusing on both promoting Mexican and international independent film around the country. The company "pioneered upscale VOD, genre pic and indie 3D movie distribution in Mexico."

2010 was an important year for Canana: they produced their first commercial hit, Abel directed by Luna, and significantly ramped up their film distribution. That same year, it joined Golden Phoenix Productions to jointly produce a number of television documentaries about the unsolved murders of around three hundred women in the border city of Ciudad Juárez. In 2011, they made their first big television deal with Netflix picking up their original series Soy tu fan.

In 2012, a new global deal was made with IM Global, launching the joint venture Mundial to promote worldwide sales of Latin American movies. In 2013, Canana joined Participant Media's five-year production deal Participant PanAmerica; their first project was the film No starring García Bernal which was nominated for the Best Foreign Language Film Oscar. Also in 2013, the company launch a branded content division.

Canana has had multiple collaborations with directors like Mariana Chenillo and Gerardo Naranjo, among others.

Filmography
Adapted from company website and IMDb.

Films 
 Dance of the 41 (Netflix; 2020)
 Miss Bala (2019)
 Zama (2017)
 Salt and Fire (2016)
 Mr. Pig (2016)
 The Chosen Ones (2016) 
 Eva Doesn't Sleep (2015)
 Sand Dollars (2014) 
 The Ardor (2014)
 César Chávez (2014)
 Carmita (2013)
 The Well (2013)
 La última película (2013)
 Paradise (2013)
 Who is Dayani Cristal? (2013)
 Come Out and Play (2012)
 No (2012)
 Verdaderamente Durazo (2011)
  (2010)
 18 cigarrillos y medio (2010)
 Post Mortem (2010)
 Cefalópodo (2010)
 Revolución (2010)
 Abel (2010)
 Sin Nombre (2009)
 Rudo y Cursi (2008)
 Just Walking (2008)
 I'm Gonna Explode (2008)
 Cochochi (2007)
 Déficit (2007)
 El búfalo de la noche (2007)
 J.C. Chávez (2007)
 Drama/Mex (2006)

Short films 

 Nana (2015)
 Drifting (2013)
 Puente Baluarte (2013)
 Los Invisibles (2010)
 Samantha (2010)

Television 

 Taco Chronicles (Netflix; 2019–2020)
 Luis Miguel: The Series (Netflix/Telemundo; 2018–2021)
 Niño Santo (Once TV; 2011–014)
 Alguien Más (Once TV; 2013)
 Fronteras (TNT Latin America; 2011)
 Soy tu fan (Once TV/MTV Latin America; 2010–2012)
 Back Home (2013)
 Ruta 32 (2006)

Film distribution 
Canana distributed a number of international films to Mexican theaters, particularly during the late 2000s. List adapted from the company website and IMDb.
 I Am Not Your Negro (2016) – United States
 All Is Lost (2013) – United States
 Gloria (2013) – Chile
 The Empty Hours (2013) – Mexico
 The Life After (2013) – Mexico
 We Are What We Are (2013) – United States
 Workers (2013) – Mexico
 Never Die (2012) – Mexico
 The Hunt (2012) – Denmark
 No quiero dormir sola (2012) – Mexico
 A Glimpse Inside the Mind of Charles Swan III (2012) – United States
 Searching for Sugarman (2012)
 The Loneliest Planet (2011) – Germany/United States
 Juan de los muertos (2011) – Cuba
 Pina (2011) – Germany
 Monsieur Lazhar (2011) – Canada
 The Prize (2011) – Germany
 Cheburashka (2010) – Russia
 We Are What We Are (2010) – Mexico
 Cave of Forgotten Dreams (2010) – Canada
 The Robber (2010) – Germany
 Exit Through the Gift Shop (2010) – United States/United Kingdom
 Año bisiesto (2010) – Mexico
 Seguir siendo: Café Tacvba (2010) – Mexico
 The Loved Ones (2009) – Australia
 Lebanon (2009) – Israel
 The Horde (2009) – France
 Rompecabezas (2009) – Argentina
 The Loved Ones (2009) – Australia
 Ajami (2009) – Israel
 The White Ribbon (2009) – Germany/Austria
 Same Same But Different (2009) – Germany
 Castaway on the Moon (2009) – South Korea
 Fish Tank (2009) – United Kingdom
 Thirst (2009) – South Korea
 The Toledo Report (2009) – Mexico
 The Milk of Sorrow (2009) – Peru
 Coming Soon (2008) – Thailand
 Troubled Water (2008) – Norway
 La vida loca (2008) – El Salvador 
 Food, Inc. (2008) – United States 
 Tony Manero (2008) – Chile 
 Gomorrah (2008) – Italy 
 Let the Right One In (2008) – Sweden 
 Man on Wire (2008) – United States 
 Sunshine Cleaning (2008) – United States 
 My Life Inside (2007) – Mexico 
 Joy Division (2007) – United Kingdom 
 Mister Lonely (2007) – United Kingdom 
 Used Parts (2007) – Mexico 
 Year of the Nail (2007) – Mexico 
 The Big Sellout (2007) – Germany 
 Cocalero (2007) – Argentina 
 The Signal (2007) – United States 
 Familia tortuga (2006) – Mexico 
 The Violin (2005) – Mexico

References

External links
  Canana Films Webpage

Companies based in Mexico City
Entertainment companies established in 2005
Film production companies of Mexico
Mass media in Mexico City